Constitution of 1802 may refer to:

Constitution of the Year X, 1802 French Constitution
Constitution of Italy (1802)
Ohio Constitutional Convention (1802)